Lewis Morrison (born 12 March 1999) is a Scottish footballer, who plays for Hurlford United on loan from Darvel in the West of Scotland Football League. He has previously played in the Scottish Premiership for Kilmarnock.

Club career
Morrison began his career at Kilmarnock and made his professional debut in the Scottish Premiership on 24 September 2016 in a game against Celtic. In March 2017, he was farmed out to his hometown club, Kilwinning Rangers, who play in the West of Scotland Super League Premier Division.

Morrison was released from his Kilmarnock contract before his loan period at Kilwinning expired, but joined St Mirren in the summer of 2017.

After leaving St Mirren in December 2017, Morrison had a short spell with Hurlford United before joining League of Ireland Premier Division side Sligo Rovers in January 2018. He returned to Hurlford in December 2018.

In March 2023, Morrison returned to Hurlford on loan from Darvel until the end of the 2022–2023 season.

References

External links
 

1999 births
Living people
Scottish footballers
Kilmarnock F.C. players
St Mirren F.C. players
Scottish Professional Football League players
League of Ireland players
West of Scotland Football League players
Sligo Rovers F.C. players
Footballers from Irvine, North Ayrshire
Kilwinning Rangers F.C. players
Hurlford United F.C. players
Scotland youth international footballers
Scottish Junior Football Association players
Association football forwards